Jean-Charles Victor Castelletto (born 26 January 1995) is a professional footballer who plays as a centre-back for Ligue 1 club Nantes and the Cameroon national team.

Club career
In July 2016, Castelletto joined Red Star on a season-long loan from Belgian side Club Brugge KV.

International career
Castelletto was a youth international for France. Castelletto made his debut for the Cameroon national team in a 2018 FIFA World Cup qualification 2–2 tie with Zambia on 11 November 2017.

He was called-up to Cameroon's squad for the 2022 FIFA World Cup. In their group stage match against Serbia on 28 November 2022, he scored his first international goal to lead for his team.

Personal life 
Castelletto was born in France to an Italian father and Cameroonian mother.

Career statistics

Clubs

International

Scores and results list Cameroon's goal tally first, score column indicates score after each Castelletto goal.

Honours 
Nantes
Coupe de France: 2021–22

Cameroon
 Third Place AFCON Tournament 2021-22.

References

External links
 
 
 
 

1995 births
Living people
People from Clamart
Citizens of Cameroon through descent
French people of Italian descent
Cameroonian people of Italian descent
French sportspeople of Cameroonian descent
Cameroonian footballers
French footballers
Footballers from Hauts-de-Seine
Association football defenders
Cameroon international footballers
France youth international footballers
2021 Africa Cup of Nations players
2022 FIFA World Cup players
Ligue 1 players
Ligue 2 players
Belgian Pro League players
AJ Auxerre players
Club Brugge KV players
Royal Excel Mouscron players
Red Star F.C. players
Stade Brestois 29 players
FC Nantes players
Cameroonian expatriate footballers
French expatriate footballers
Cameroonian expatriate sportspeople in Belgium
French expatriate sportspeople in Belgium
Expatriate footballers in Belgium